Janet Margaret Boyle (born 25 July 1963) is a former high jumper from Northern Ireland. She represented Great Britain & Northern Ireland at the 1988 Olympic Games in Seoul. At the Commonwealth Games, she won a bronze medal in Edinburgh 1986 and a silver medal in Auckland 1990.

Early life
Boyle was born in Belfast, Northern Ireland.

Athletics career
Boyle first came to prominence in 1983, finishing second at the UK Championships with 1.80 metres and third at the AAA Championships with 1.85 m.

Boyle won her first UK title in 1985 with a clearance of 1.86m. In 1986, she earned selection for both the Commonwealth Games and the European Championships. At the Commonwealth Games in Edinburgh, representing Northern Ireland in a high quality competition, she won the bronze medal with a personal best of 1.90m. Northern Ireland won two medals, as her teammate Sharon McPeake won the silver medal, also clearing 1.90m. At the Europeans in Stuttgart, she was eliminated in the qualifying round with a best of 1.83m. She ended the season by improving her PB at a meeting at the Crystal Palace in September, clearing 1.91m.

In 1987, Boyle won the AAAs indoor title with a jump of 1.90m and went on to finish sixth at the European Indoor Championships in Lievin, with 1.91m. This would remain her best ever indoor clearance. Outdoors, she placed second to Diana Davies at the UK Championships. No female high jumper from the UK was selected for that years World Championships in Rome.

Boyle reached her peak in 1988. She won at the AAAs Championships, also incorporating the UK Olympic trials, equalling her PB of 1.91m. Then at the Seoul Olympics she achieved her lifetime best with 1.92m in the qualifying round, to reach the Olympic final. In the final, she cleared 1.90m to finish 12th. Diana Davies also reached the final, finishing equal eighth, making 1988 the last time (as of 2014) that two women from the UK reached the Olympic high jump final.

Boyle continued as one of the UK's leading jumpers for the next four years. In 1989, she won her second UK title with a 1.83m clearance. In 1990, at her second Commonwealth Games in Auckland, she won the silver medal with 1.88m, losing the gold medal in a jump off with New Zealand's Tania Murray. In 1991, she was third at the UK Championships and second at the AAAs Championships, behind Debbie Marti. She competed at the 1992 AAAs Championships, which were also the Olympic trials, but failed to earn selection for the Barcelona Olympics.

As of 2015, Boyle's best of 1.92m from Seoul in 1988, ranks her 11th on the UK all-time list and remains the Northern Irish record.

Achievements
AAAs National Champion (1988)
UK National Champion (1985, 1989)
AAAs National Indoor Champion (1987)
Northern Irish Champion (1985, 1988)

Notes:
Result with (q) indicate overall position in qualifying round. 
Height in (#) indicates height achieved in qualifying round

References

External links

Sportspeople from Belfast
Female high jumpers from Northern Ireland
Athletes (track and field) at the 1988 Summer Olympics
Olympic athletes of Great Britain
Athletes (track and field) at the 1986 Commonwealth Games
Athletes (track and field) at the 1990 Commonwealth Games
Commonwealth Games silver medallists for Northern Ireland
Commonwealth Games bronze medallists for Northern Ireland
Commonwealth Games medallists in athletics
1963 births
Living people
Medallists at the 1986 Commonwealth Games
Medallists at the 1990 Commonwealth Games